The American Junior was made by American Motor Vehicle Company of Lafayette, Indiana from 1916 to 1920. Also known simply as the American, it was an ultra-light two-seat vehicle with a one-cylinder engine. It was mainly intended to be sold for children. Its manufacturers hoped to compete with rickshaws in China and to produce electric vehicles for invalids.

References
Georgano, G.N., "American (iv)", in G.N. Georgano, ed., The Complete Encyclopedia of Motorcars 1885-1968  (New York: E.P. Dutton and Co., 1974), pp. 41.  .

Lafayette, Indiana
Vintage vehicles